Go with What You Know is a 2006 album by Dweezil Zappa. Among other tracks, the album features an alternate version of his father Frank Zappa's composition "Peaches en Regalia". The version, culled from a previously unreleased alternate edit of the Hot Rats version, features new overdubs by Dweezil.

Track listing 
All songs composed by Dweezil Zappa except as noted.
"Love Ride"
"Noitpure"
"Fighty Bitey"
"CC$" (Zappa, Blues Saraceno)
"Preludumus Maximus"
"Rhythmatist"
"Thunder Pimp"
"All Roads Lead to Inca"
"Electrocoustic Matter"
"The Grind" (Zappa, TJ Helmerich)
"Peaches en Regalia" (Frank Zappa)
"Chunga's Whiskers"
"Audio Movie"

References

External links
Official website

2006 albums
Dweezil Zappa albums
Zappa Records albums